is a Japanese football player. He plays for Tegevajaro Miyazaki.

Career
Yudai Tokunaga joined J3 League club SC Sagamihara in 2017.

Club statistics
Updated to 1 January 2020.

References

External links

1994 births
Living people
Kwansei Gakuin University alumni
Association football people from Hyōgo Prefecture
Japanese footballers
J3 League players
Japan Football League players
SC Sagamihara players
Tegevajaro Miyazaki players
Association football midfielders